A presidente municipal (English: "municipal president") is the chief of government of municipios in Mexico. This title was also used in the Philippines during the Spanish and American colonial periods; it is comparable to a mayor of the town or city. The position is comparable to the county executive of a county in the United States or to the mayor of a city in the United States, although the jurisdiction of a presidente municipal includes not only a city but the municipality surrounding it.  Nationally, this position is also equivalent to that of Head of Government of the Federal District and that is why these positions are sometimes referred to as "mayors" in English-language publications.

Lists
Municipal president of Cananea
Municipal president of Chihuahua
Municipal president of Ciudad Juárez
Municipal president of Mérida, Yucatán
Municipal president of Monterrey
Municipal president of Sabinas Hidalgo
Municipal president of Puebla

See also
Alcalde
 Municipalities of Mexico, the jurisdiction of a presidente municipal

Politics of Mexico
Political chief executives in Mexico
Local politicians in Mexico
Heads of local government
 
Positions of subnational authority